Brunn is a locality situated in Värmdö Municipality, Stockholm County, Sweden with 950 inhabitants in 2010.

References 

Populated places in Värmdö Municipality